Saraswati Mandir High (SMH) School, Khatangi is a high school in rural Bihar in India.  It is situated in the Khatangi village of Arwal district of Bihar.

History
Saraswati Mandir High School, Khatangi was established in between the years 1950 and 1952. The school was built at a remote area with rural students and some excellent teachers. Shri Kailash Sharma, a simple peasant, who died in 1978 over the age of one hundred, founded the school. He did the great work for rural students, especially poorer students, to provide a quality education for the students. The alumni of this school are serving the nation by achieving high positions in government and private sectors.

Schools in Bihar
Arwal
1951 establishments in Bihar
Educational institutions established in 1951